Anda Šafranska (born December 2, 1960 in Riga) is a Latvian-born chess player who holds the title of Woman Grandmaster. Anda Šafranska for many years was one of the best women's chess players in Latvia. She won the Latvian Chess Championship for women eight times: 1982, 1984, 1990, 1991, 1993, 1994, 1996, and 1997.

Šafranska played for Latvia in Chess Olympiads:
 In 1992, at second board in the 30th Chess Olympiad in Manila (+6, =0, -6);
 In 1994, at first board in the 31st Chess Olympiad in Moscow (+3, =3, -5);
 In 1996, at first board in the 32nd Chess Olympiad in Yerevan (+6, =4, -4);
 In 2006, at third board in the 37th Chess Olympiad in Turin (+1, =1, -4).

She played for Latvia in European Team Chess Championship:
 In 1992, at second board in Debrecen (+2, =2, -3);
 In 1994, at first board in Pula (+3, =1, -3).

Since 2000 Šafranska lives in Léon, France, and she now plays for France.

Šafranska played for France in World Team Chess Championship:
 In 2013, at third board in Astana (+0, =3, -3).

Married with French chess grandmaster Vladimir Lazarev.

FIDE ratings

References

External links
 
 
 

1960 births
Living people
French female chess players
Latvian female chess players
Soviet female chess players
Chess woman grandmasters
Sportspeople from Riga